Fox-1E, AO-109, Evolution or AMSAT OSCAR 109 is an American amateur radio satellite. It is a 1U Cubesat, was built by the AMSAT-NA and carries a single-channel transponder for FM radio. Fox-1E is the fifth amateur radio satellite of the Fox series of AMSAT North America.

Mission 
The satellite was launched on 17 January 2021, with a LauncherOne rocket. This carrier was brought, notched and detonated by the "Cosmic Girl", a converted Boeing 747, from the Mojave Air and Space Port, California, United States, and to an altitude of approx. . The flight was carried out on behalf of NASA's CubeSat Launch Initiative (CSLI) program and put 10 satellites into orbit as part of the Rideshare ELaNa 20 mission.

The telemetry beacon could not yet be received, but the transponder is partially in operation with reduced signal strength. Work on commissioning the telemetry beacon and checking the transponder will continue with the aim of opening the satellite for general use.

The satellite became operational on 20 July 2021.

See also 

 OSCAR

References

External links 
 
  ARRL

Satellites orbiting Earth
Amateur radio satellites
Spacecraft launched in 2021